Charlotte (Charlotte Adelgonde Elisabeth Marie Wilhelmine; 23 January 1896 – 9 July 1985) reigned as Grand Duchess of Luxembourg from 14 January 1919 until her abdication on 12 November 1964.

She acceded to the throne on 14 January 1919 following the abdication of her sister, Marie-Adélaïde, due to political pressure over Marie-Adélaïde's role during the German occupation of Luxembourg during World War I. A referendum retained the monarchy with Charlotte as grand duchess.

She married Prince Felix of Bourbon-Parma on 6 November 1919. They had six children. Following the 1940 German invasion of Luxembourg during World War II, Charlotte went into exile: first in France, then Portugal, Great Britain, and North America. While in Britain, she made broadcasts to the people of Luxembourg. She returned to Luxembourg in April 1945.

She abdicated in 1964, and was succeeded by her son Jean. Charlotte died from cancer on 9 July 1985. She was the last agnatic member of the House of Nassau. She was the last personal recipient of the Golden Rose and since her death there are no living personal recipients of that honour, which in modern times has been awarded only to churches and shrines.

Early life and tenure as Grand Duchess

Born in Berg Castle, Charlotte of Nassau-Weilburg, Princess of Luxembourg, was the second daughter of Grand Duke William IV and his wife, Marie Anne of Portugal.

Her older sister, Marie-Adélaide, had succeeded their father. However, Marie-Adélaïde's actions had become controversial, and she was seen as friendly to the German occupation of Luxembourg during World War I. There were calls in parliament for her abdication, and she was forced to abdicate on 14 January 1919.

Luxembourg adopted a new constitution that year. In a referendum on 28 September 1919, 77.8% of the Luxembourgish people voted for the continuation of the monarchy with Grand Duchess Charlotte as head of state. However, in the new constitution, the powers of the monarch were severely restricted.

Reign
By 1935, Charlotte had sold her German properties, the former residential palaces of the Dukes of Nassau, Biebrich Palace and Schloss Weilburg, to the State of Prussia. During World War II the grand ducal family left Luxembourg shortly before the arrival of Nazi troops. Luxembourg's neutrality was violated on 9 May 1940, while the Grand Duchess and her family were in residence at Colmar-Berg. That day she called an extraordinary meeting of her leading ministers, and they all decided to place themselves under the protection of France, described by the Grand Duchess as a difficult but necessary decision. Initially the family took up residence at the Château de Montastruc in south-western France, but the rapid advance of the German forces into France followed by French capitulation the next month caused the French government to refuse any guarantee of security to the exiled Luxembourg government. Permission was received to cross Spain provided they did not stop en route, and the Grand Duchess with her ministers moved on to Portugal.

The Germans proposed to restore the Grand Duchess to her functions, but Charlotte refused, mindful of her sister's experiences of remaining in Luxembourg under German occupation during the First World War. By 29 August 1940 Grand Duchess Charlotte was in London where she began to make supportive broadcasts to her homeland using the BBC. Later she travelled to the United States and to Canada. Her children continued their schooling in Montreal while she had several meetings with President Roosevelt who encouraged her itinerant campaigning across the country in support of his own opposition to isolationism which was a powerful political current until the Pearl Harbor attacks. In the meantime Luxembourg, along with the adjacent French Moselle department, found itself integrated into an expanded Germany under the name Heim ins Reich, which left Luxembourgers required to speak German and liable for conscription into the German army.

In 1943 Grand Duchess Charlotte and the Luxembourg government established themselves in London: her broadcasts became a more regular feature of the BBC schedules, establishing her as a focus for the resistance movements in Luxembourg. The Grand Ducal family went to North America in exile, settling first on the Marjorie Merriweather Post estate in Brookville, Long Island and then in Montreal. The Grand Duchess visited Washington DC and made a goodwill tour of the US to keep the profile of Luxembourg high in the eyes of the Allies.

Charlotte's younger sister Antonia and brother-in-law Rupprecht, Crown Prince of Bavaria, were exiled from Germany in 1939. In 1944, living now in Hungary, Crown Princess Antonia was captured when the Germans invaded Hungary and found herself deported to the concentration camp at Dachau, being later transferred to Flossenbürg where she survived torture but only with her health badly impaired. Meanwhile, from 1942 Grand Duchess Charlotte's eldest son, Jean, served as a volunteer in the British Army's Irish Guards, after the war becoming its Honorary Colonel-in-chief (1984-2000).  

In the years after the war, Charlotte showed a lot of public activity which contributed to raising Luxembourg's profile on the international stage, by hosting visits from foreign heads of state and other dignitaries, such as Eleanor Roosevelt (1950), Queen Juliana of the Netherlands (1951), René Coty (1957), King Baudouin of Belgium (1959), King Bhumibol of Thailand (1961), and King Olav V of Norway (1964). Likewise, she visited Pope Pius XII (1950), Charles de Gaulle (1961), and John F. Kennedy (1963).

In 1951 Charlotte and her prime minister Pierre Dupong by decree admitted into the nobility of Luxembourg three Swedish relatives who were not allowed to use their birth titles in Sweden. They were then named as Sigvard Prince Bernadotte, Carl Johan Prince Bernadotte and Lennart Prince Bernadotte and also, with their legitimate descendants, were given the hereditary titles of Counts and Countesses of Wisborg there.

Abdication and later life

On 12 November 1964, she abdicated in favour of her son Jean, who then reigned until his abdication in 2000.

Charlotte died at Schloss Fischbach on 9 July 1985, from cancer. She was interred in the Ducal Crypt of the Notre-Dame Cathedral in the city of Luxembourg.

A statue of the Grand Duchess is in Place Clarefontaine in the city of Luxembourg.

Marriage and children
On 6 November 1919 in Luxembourg, she married Prince Felix of Bourbon-Parma, a first cousin on her mother's side. (Both Charlotte and Felix were grandchildren of King Miguel of Portugal, through his daughters Maria Anna and Maria Antonia, respectively). With the marriage, their lineal descent was raised in style from Grand Ducal Highness to Royal Highness. 

The couple had six children: 
 Jean, Grand Duke of Luxembourg (1921–2019), who married HRH Princess Joséphine-Charlotte of Belgium (1927–2005)
 Princess Elizabeth of Luxembourg (1922–2011), who married HSH Franz, Duke of Hohenberg (1927–1977)
 Princess Marie Adelaide of Luxembourg (1924–2007), who married Karl Josef Graf Henckel von Donnersmarck (1928–2008)
 Princess Marie Gabrielle of Luxembourg (1925–2023), who married Knud Johan, Count of Holstein-Ledreborg (1919–2001)
 Prince Charles of Luxembourg (1927–1977), who married Joan Douglas Dillon (born 1935), the former wife of James Brady Moseley
 Princess Alix of Luxembourg (1929–2019), who married Antoine, 13th Prince of Ligne (1925–2005)

Titles, styles, and honours

Honours
National honours
 :
 Knight Grand Cross of the Order of the Gold Lion of the House of Nassau
 Recipient of the Luxembourg War Cross

Foreign honours
 
 Knight Grand Cross of the Order of Fidelity (1931)
 Austria
  Austrian Imperial Family: Dame of the Order of the Starry Cross, 1st Class
  Austrian Republic: Grand Cross of the Decoration for Services to the Republic of Austria
 : Knight of the Order of the Elephant - 21 March 1955
 : Grand Cross of the Legion of Honour - 22 June 1923
 :
 Dame Grand Cross of the Order of Pius IX
 Cross of Honour of the "Pro Ecclesia et Pontifice"
 The Golden Rose
 Italy:
  Parmese Ducal Family: Dame Grand Cross of the Sacred Military Constantinian Order of Saint George
 : Grand Cross of the Order of Saint-Charles - 20 January 1949
 : Grand Officer of the Order of Social Welfare, Special Class
 : Knight Grand Cross of the Order of the Netherlands Lion
: Knight Grand Cross with Collar of the Order of St. Olav - 1964
:
 Dame Grand Cross of the Order of the Tower and Sword - 29 September 1933
 Grand Cross of the Sash of the Two Orders - 23 January 1949
: Dame Grand Cross of the Royal and Distinguished Order of Charles III
: Member of the Order of the Seraphim - 14 April 1939
: Dame of the Order of the Royal House of Chakri - 17 October 1965

Gallery

Notes and references

External links
 
 Charlotte's page on the official website of the Grand-Ducal House of Luxembourg

1896 births
1985 deaths
People from Colmar-Berg
Luxembourgian Roman Catholics
Grand Dukes of Luxembourg
Luxembourgian princesses
Luxembourgian anti-communists
Princesses of Nassau-Weilburg
House of Nassau-Weilburg
World War II political leaders
Luxembourgian people of World War II
Female resistance members of World War II
Monarchs who abdicated
Burials at Notre-Dame Cathedral, Luxembourg

Grand Crosses of the Order of Merit of the Grand Duchy of Luxembourg

Recipients of the Grand Star of the Decoration for Services to the Republic of Austria
Grand Croix of the Légion d'honneur
Knights of the Order of Pope Pius IX
Knights Grand Cross of the Order of Pope Pius IX
Knights of the Order of the Netherlands Lion
2
2
Luxembourgian people of German descent
Luxembourgian people of Danish descent
Luxembourgian people of Portuguese descent
Luxembourgian people of Italian descent
19th-century Luxembourgian women
20th-century Luxembourgian women
20th-century women rulers
Recipients of the Order of the White Eagle (Poland)
Grand Crosses of the Order of Saint-Charles